The Latin American Poker Tour (LAPT) was a major poker tour in Latin America, held from 2008 to 2016. The LAPT was sponsored by PokerStars, like its counterparts, the European Poker Tour (2004), Asia Pacific Poker Tour (2007), and North American Poker Tour (2010).

Season 1

Season 2

Season 3

Season 4

Season 5

Season 6

Season 7

Season 8

Season 9

Season 10

Winners by country

Up to Season 10 - LAPT Rio de Janeiro

Seats at final tables by country

Up to Season 10 - LAPT Rio de Janeiro

Top 10 prizes

''Up to Season 10 - LAPT Rio de Janeiro

See also 
 Latin American Poker Tour season 1 results
 Latin American Poker Tour season 2 results
 Latin American Poker Tour season 3 results
 Latin American Poker Tour season 4 results
 Latin American Poker Tour season 5 results
 Latin American Poker Tour season 6 results

Notes

External links 
Official site
CardPlayer.com - Latin American Poker Tour Event in Rio Plays Final Table

 
Poker tournaments